Len Phillips  (1922–2011) was an English footballer

Len Phillips may also refer to:

Len Phillips (footballer, born 1890) (1890-1968), Australian rules footballer for St Kilda and Essendon
Len Phillips (footballer, born 1891) (1891-1978), Australian rules footballer for Richmond

See also
Leonard Phillips (1870–1947), New Zealand politician